"Sweet Escape" is a song by Swedish DJ and record producer Alesso featuring Swedish singer-songwriter Sirena. It was released on 15 May 2015. The song written by Alesso, Elsa Oljelund and Lotus IV, produced by Alesso and Lotus IV.

Background
The song debut performed during Ultra Music Festival set in 2014, and later it's major track that Alesso live sets ever since.

Composition
The song with soft violin sounds as Sirena energetic vocals and into a blissful mix of uplifting and sensational synth.

Charts

Weekly charts

Year-end charts

References

2015 songs
Alesso songs
Song recordings produced by Alesso